Mechanic: Resurrection is a 2016 American action thriller film directed by Dennis Gansel and written by Philip Shelby and Tony Mosher, with a story by Shelby and Brian Pittman. It is the sequel to the 2011 film The Mechanic, which was a remake of the 1972 film of the same name. The film stars Jason Statham, Tommy Lee Jones, Jessica Alba and Michelle Yeoh.

Mechanic: Resurrection premiered in Hollywood on August 22, 2016, and was theatrically released in the United States on August 26, 2016. It received mostly negative reviews, but grossed $125 million worldwide against a budget of $40 million, eclipsing its predecessor and making it a financial success.

Plot
Since faking his own death, Arthur Bishop has been living quietly in Rio de Janeiro under the name Santos. He is approached by a courier, Renee Tran, who knows his true identity and explains that her employer wishes Bishop to kill three targets and stage their deaths as accidents. Bishop escapes, eluding her and her mercenaries and fleeing to Thailand. He takes shelter at the resort island beach house of his friend, Mei, and learns that Tran is working for Riah Crain.

Some time later, a bruised woman, Gina Thornton, approaches Mei for first aid before returning to a boat anchored nearby. Mei sees her being beaten by a man aboard the boat and alerts Bishop. Together, they rescue Thornton, but in the scuffle, the man's head hits a bollard and he dies. Bishop searches, unsuccessfully, for evidence of the man's identity, then sets the boat ablaze. While Mei tends to Thornton's injuries, Bishop finds that Thornton is also connected to Crain, and concludes that Crain anticipated Bishop would become romantic with her: Crain would then kidnap her to make Bishop take the assassination jobs. On being confronted with his theory, Thornton reveals that Crain had threatened the children's shelter in Cambodia that she runs unless she participated. Over the next few days, Bishop gets to know Thornton better and they fall in love. As expected, Crain's mercenaries arrive and abduct them.

Crain keeps Thornton hostage to ensure Bishop completes the assassinations. The first target is a warlord named Krill, held in a Malaysian prison. Bishop gets himself imprisoned by posing as a wanted man, and gains Krill's trust by killing a man who attempts to kill him who turned out to be Krill's former right-hand man. Bishop then kills Krill himself by overdosing him with snake venom and escapes with the help of Crain's operatives. The next target is Adrian Cook, a Sydney-based billionaire and former trafficker of underage sex workers. Bishop bypasses the tight security of Cook's penthouse apartment and breaks the glass bottom of his overhanging pool using a tube containing chemicals that cause the glass to crack, sending him plummeting to his death.

While relaying details of the third target, Crain allows Bishop to speak to Thornton, who repositions the camera, enabling Bishop to identify Crain's boat. Bishop attempts a rescue, but Crain is able to thwart it. The final target is Max Adams, an American arms dealer in Varna, Bulgaria. While planning his attempt, Bishop realizes that the targets are Crain's only major competition in arms dealing. Bishop instead approaches Adams to warn him of Crain's plan and recruit his help. Bishop fakes Adams' death, then reports his success to Crain, directing him to the submarine pen to find the body.

At the pen, Bishop decimates Crain's mercenaries then makes for Crain's boat anchored nearby. He fights off more of Crain's men and rescues Thornton. He discovers the boat is rigged with explosives and puts Thornton in an emergency release pod. Bishop kills the remaining mercenaries, then overpowers Crain and secures him to the boat with a metal chain. The bombs explode, killing Crain and seemingly Bishop.

Thornton is rescued and the remains of Crain's boat are salvaged. Thornton returns to Cambodia and her teaching duties and is surprised when Bishop turns up there. Adams discovers how Bishop survived: he escaped in a watertight chain locker but destroys the evidence as a token of gratitude for sparing his life and enabling him to monopolize the arms trade by taking market share from Bishop's main victims.

Cast

Production

Casting
On February 4, 2015, Natalie Burn was added to the cast of the film.

Filming
Filming began on November 4, 2014, in Bangkok (Thailand). Filming also took place in Buzludzha (Bulgaria), George Town (Malaysia), Sugarloaf Mountain (Brazil), Sydney Harbour (Australia) and Phnom Penh (Cambodia)

Release

Theatrical
On November 7, 2014, Lionsgate set the film for a January 22, 2016 release. The film was later moved back to April 15, 2016, and on August 3, 2015, the release was again delayed until August 26, 2016.

Reception

Box office
Mechanic: Resurrection grossed $21.2 million in North America and $104.5 million in other territories for a worldwide total of $125.7 million.

The film was released in the United States and Canada on August 26, 2016, alongside Don't Breathe and Hands of Stone, and was projected to open to $6–8 million from 2,258 theaters. It grossed $2.6 million on its first day and $7.5 million in its opening weekend, finishing 5th at the box office.

In China, the film made $24.3 million in opening weekend. China was the largest territory for the film, with a total gross of $49.2 million.

Critical response
On review aggregation website Rotten Tomatoes the film holds an approval rating of 31% based on 59 reviews, with an average rating of 4.45/10. The website's critical consensus reads: "With little to recommend beyond a handful of entertaining set pieces, Mechanic: Resurrection suggests this franchise should have remained in its tomb." On Metacritic, which assigns a weighted average score, the film has a score of 38 out of 100, based on 15 critics, indicating "generally unfavorable reviews". Audiences polled by CinemaScore gave the film an average grade of "B+" on an A+ to F scale.

Varietys Owen Gleiberman gave the film a positive review and praised Statham. He says this what the first film should have been, "a bite-sized Bond film, or maybe a grittier homicidal knockoff of the Mission: Impossible series, with a lone-wolf renegade as the entire team."
Frank Scheck of The Hollywood Reporter praised Statham but gave a mixed review saying "it's all about as ridiculous as it sounds, with Statham's character hopscotching across the globe in mere hours; equipped with unlimited resources and advanced knowledge of chemistry, architecture and engineering; and seemingly physically invulnerable", but also noted "the film is certainly watchable, thanks to the elaborately staged action sequences and Statham's killer charisma."

References

External links

 
 

2016 films
2016 action thriller films
American action thriller films
Films about contract killing
Films set in Brazil
Films set in Bulgaria
Films shot in Thailand
Films set in Thailand
Films set in Malaysia
Films shot in Malaysia
Films shot in Bulgaria
Films shot in Brazil
Films shot in Sydney
Films set in Sydney
Films directed by Dennis Gansel
Lionsgate films
Summit Entertainment films
Films scored by Mark Isham
The Mechanic films
2010s English-language films
2010s American films